Marcus Julius Gessius Bassianus (flourished 3rd century) was a Magister (master) in the Arval Brethren during the reign of Roman emperor Caracalla who ruled from 212 until 217.

Bassianus seems to be linked to the Julii and the Bassiani. From his name, could point to him as a possible son of the Syrian Roman nobles Marcus Julius Gessius Marcianus and Julia Avita Mamaea, being a possible brother of Roman emperor Alexander Severus and his sister, Theoclia. If this is correct, Bassianus was a relation to the Royal family of Emesa and the Severan dynasty of the Roman Empire.

Bassianus was not a known Priest of the cult of Elagabalus. Although he was a Roman Priest, was unable to attend the ceremonies of the Arval Brethren in Rome, probably due to Bassianus being based in the East.

References

Sources
Augustan History, "The Two Maximini" 
A.R. Birley, Septimius Severus: The African Emperor, Routledge, 2002
L. de Arrizabalaga y Prado, The Emperor Elagabalus: Fact or Fiction?, Cambridge University Press, 2010

3rd-century Romans
Priests of the Roman Empire
Emesene dynasty
Julii
Gessii
3rd-century clergy
3rd-century people